Pionono describes different sweet or savory pastries from Granada, Spain, the Caribbean, South America, and the Philippines. It is named after Pope Pius IX's name in Spanish, .

By country

Spain
Piononos are small pastries traditional in Santa Fe, a small town adjacent to the city of Granada, Spain. A pionono has two parts: a thin layer of pastry rolled into a cylinder, drenched with different kinds of syrup which give the pionono a sweet and pleasant texture, and crowned with toasted cream. It is typically eaten in one or two bites.

South America and Cuba
In various South American countries such as Argentina, Uruguay, Paraguay, Venezuela, Colombia, Peru and Cuba, piononos are prepared using a dough made of flour, eggs, and sugar, which is baked in a thin sheet then rolled around a filling of dulce de leche sometimes with walnuts, or fruits like strawberries with chantilly cream, or in the case of  savory piononos with cured ham, cheese, tomato and mayonnaise, or a savory salad, such as ham salad with asparagus and lettuce, chicken salad or even tuna. A similar cake is called "Brazo de Gitano" or "Brazo Gitano" in Cuba, Spain, and several other Spanish-speaking countries. In Uruguay a similar preparation called massini is not rolled and its dough is filled in between with whipped cream and covered with burnt yolks.

Puerto Rico (U.S.)
In Puerto Rico, piononos are prepared using ripe, or yellow, plantains as the "bread" around a savory filling. It is usually stuffed with a meat filling usually picadillo, seafood or vegetables with cheese; the whole sandwich is dipped in a batter made from flour and eggs and then deep-fried.

Philippines

In the Philippines, pionono is more commonly spelled as pianono. It is a rolled sponge cake and is more accurately a type of jelly roll. It consists of a layer of pastry made from eggs, sugar, and sifted flour baked in a sheet. Once cooled, jelly or other types of filling is spread over the pastry. It is then rolled from one end to the other. Its most common traditional filling is simply sugar and butter (or margarine), similar to the other forms of the Filipino mamón (sponge cakes). Modern versions, however, are commonly frosted and can include a variety of fillings.

Gallery

See also

Brazo de Mercedes
Swiss roll
Yule log (cake)
Nut roll

References

External links
Puerto Rican piononos with lobster
Pianono

Caribbean cuisine
Colombian cuisine
Cuban cuisine
Argentine pastries
Spanish pastries
Peruvian desserts
Puerto Rican cuisine
Venezuelan cuisine
Philippine pastries
Pope Pius IX